Alessandro Lever (born 4 December 1998) is an Italian basketball player for Pallacanestro Trieste of the Italia Lega Basket Serie A (LBA).

Youth career
On September 10, 2014, Lever signed with Italian side Grissin Bon Reggio Emilia, he played three games for the team in the 2015–16 season. He played a EuroCup game for the team in the 2015–16 season. In the 2016–17 season, he played a single game for the team where he scored three points and had a rebound.

College career
Lever began playing college basketball for Grand Canyon in Phoenix in 2017. In his freshman season, he averaged 12.2 points, 4.4 rebounds and 1.2 assists per game. In his sophomore year, he averaged 12.5 points, 4.3 rebounds and 1.4 assists per game. In his junior season he averaged 16 points, 5.9 rebounds and 2.3 assists per came. In a match against Illinois State, Lever scored 23 points as Grand Canyon won, 68–63. Lever was named to the Second Team All-Western Athletic Conference. During his senior year, he helped lead Grand Canyon to their first NCAA tournament in program history.

Professional career
After the college years, Lever returned to Italy signing with Pallacanestro Trieste.

National team career
Lever represented Italy in the 2014 FIBA Europe Under-16 Championship in Latvia where he averaged 5 points, 2.8 rebounds and 0.3 assists per game. He also participated in the 2016 FIBA U18 European Championship where he averaged  13.2 points, 5.8 rebounds and 0.7 assists per game. He also participated in the 2018 FIBA U20 European Championship where he averaged 13.9 points, 5.1 rebounds and 0.6 assists.

Career statistics

College

|-
| style="text-align:left;"| 2017–18
| style="text-align:left;"| Grand Canyon
| 34 || 27 || 21.3 || .453 || .321 || .766 || 4.4 || 1.2 || .4 || .4 || 12.2
|-
| style="text-align:left;"| 2018–19
| style="text-align:left;"| Grand Canyon
| 34 || 33 || 25.5 || .447 || .354 || .748 || 4.3 || 1.4 || .4 || .1 || 12.5
|-
| style="text-align:left;"| 2019–20
| style="text-align:left;"| Grand Canyon
| 30 || 30 || 33.5 || .535 || .383 || .789 || 6.0 || 2.2 || .5 || .2 || 15.7
|-
| style="text-align:left;"| 2020–21
| style="text-align:left;"| Grand Canyon
| 24 || 24 || 28.5 || .509 || .378 || .634 || 5.4 || 1.7 || .3 || .2 || 13.3
|-
| style="text-align:center;" colspan="2"|Career
| 122 || 114 || 26.9 || .485 || .359 || .741 || 4.9 || 1.6 || .4 || .2 || 13.4

References

External links
Grand Canyon Antelopes bio

1998 births
Living people
Centers (basketball)
Grand Canyon Antelopes men's basketball players
Italian expatriate basketball people in the United States
Italian men's basketball players
Lega Basket Serie A players
Pallacanestro Reggiana players
Pallacanestro Trieste players
Sportspeople from Bolzano